The Men's 10000 metres at the 2010 Commonwealth Games as part of the athletics programme was held at the Jawaharlal Nehru Stadium on Monday 11 October 2010.

There was just a final held.

Records

Final

External links
2010 Commonwealth Games - Athletics

Men's 10000 metres
2010